The Madras Army was the army of the Presidency of Madras, one of the three presidencies of British India within the British Empire.

The presidency armies, like the presidencies themselves, belonged to the East India Company until the Government of India Act 1858 (passed in the aftermath of the Indian Rebellion of 1857) transferred all three presidencies to the direct authority of the British Crown.

In 1895 all three presidency armies were merged into the British Indian Army.

Establishment and early history

The Madras Army of the Honourable East India Company came into being through the need to protect the Company's commercial interests. These were mostly untrained guards, with only some bearing arms. The French attack and capture of Madras in 1746 forced the British hand. In 1757, the East India Company decided to raise well-trained military units to conduct operations, conquer territory, and demand allegiance from local rulers.

The loosely organised military units were later combined into battalions with Indian officers commanding local troops. One of the first major actions fought by these troops was the battle of Wandiwash in 1760. The troops were highly praised for their steadiness under fire. Earlier a good part of the force was sent to Bengal under young Clive, who made history and a personal fortune after the Battle of Plassey.

The Madras Army officers were in the early years very conscious of the soldiers' local customs, caste rituals, dress, and social hierarchy. Some leading landowners joined the Madras Army, one of whom is recorded as Mootoo (Muthu) Nayak from the nobility in Madura. As the army expanded and new officers came in, mostly from Company sources, the leadership style and care of the men changed for the worse. The most famous incident in the Madras Army was the Vellore mutiny. After Tipu Sultan was killed, his two sons were held in British custody in Vellore Fort. On the night of 10 July 1806 the sepoys of three Madrasi regiments garrisoning Vellore Fort mutinied, killing 129 British officers and soldiers. The rising, caused by a mixture of military and political grievances, was suppressed within hours by a force which included loyal Madras cavalry.

In the 1830s the Madras Army was concerned with internal security and support for the civil administration. This was a multi-ethnic army in which the British officers were encouraged to learn and speak Asian languages. In 1832–33 superior discipline and training enabled the Madras Army to put down a rebellion in the Visakhapatnam district.

Under the British Raj

Post-1857 history
The Army of the Madras Presidency remained almost unaffected by the Indian Rebellion of 1857. By contrast with the larger Bengal Army where all but twelve (out of eighty-four) infantry and cavalry regiments either mutinied or were disbanded, all fifty-two regiments of Madras Native Infantry remained loyal and passed into the new Indian Army when direct British Crown rule replaced that of the Honourable East India Company. Four regiments of Madras Light Cavalry and the Madras Artillery batteries did however disappear in the post-1858 reorganisation of the Presidency Armies. The Madras Fusiliers (a regiment of European infantry recruited by the East India Company for service in India) was transferred to the regular British Army.

End of the separate Madras Army
In 1895, the three separate Presidency Armies began a process of unification which was not to be concluded until the Kitchener reforms of eight years later.
As an initial step the Army of India was divided into four commands, each commanded by a lieutenant-general. These comprised Madras (including Burma), Punjab (including the North West Frontier), Bengal and Bombay (including Aden). In 1903 the separately numbered regiments of the Madras, Bombay and Bengal Armies were unified in a single organisational sequence and the presidency affiliations disappeared.

Disbanding of Madras infantry regiments
While the Madras Army remained in existence as a separate entity until 1895, twelve of the Madras Native Infantry regiments were disbanded between 1862 and 1864. A further eight went in 1882, three between 1902 and 1904, two in 1907 and four in 1922. The remainder were disbanded between 1923 and 1933, leaving the highly regarded Madras Sappers and Miners as the only Madrasi unit in the Indian Army until a new Madras Regiment was raised in 1942, during World War II. Both of these regiments continue to exist in the modern Indian Army.

The gradual phasing out of Madrasi recruitment for the Indian Army in the late 19th century, in favour of Sikhs, Rajputs, Dogras and Punjabi Mussalmans, was justified by General Sir Frederick Roberts on the grounds that long periods of peace and inactivity in Southern India had rendered the Madras infantry soldier inferior to the Martial Races of the North.
The military historians John Keegan and Philip Mason have however pointed out that under the "watertight" Presidency Army system, Madras regiments had little opportunity of active service on the North-West Frontier. As a result, the more ambitious and capable British officers of the Indian Army opted for service with Punjabi and other northern units and the overall efficiency of the Madras Army suffered accordingly.

Composition

Madras Native Infantry

 1st Regiment of Madras Native Infantry
 2nd Regiment of Madras Native Infantry
 3rd Regiment of Madras Native Infantry Palamcottah Light Infantry
 4th Regiment of Madras Native Infantry
 5th Regiment of Madras Native Infantry
 6th Regiment of Madras Native Infantry
 7th Regiment of Madras Native Infantry
 8th Regiment of Madras Native Infantry
 9th Regiment of Madras Native Infantry
 10th Regiment of Madras Native Infantry
 11th Regiment of Madras Native Infantry
 12th Regiment of Madras Native Infantry
 13th Regiment of Madras Native Infantry
 14th Regiment of Madras Native Infantry
 16th Regiment of Madras Native Infantry
 17th Regiment of Madras Native Infantry
 18th Regiment of Madras Native Infantry
 19th Regiment of Madras Native Infantry
 20th Regiment of Madras Native Infantry
 21st Regiment of Madras Native Infantry
 22nd Regiment of Madras Native Infantry
 23rd Regiment of Madras Native Infantry Wallajahbad Light infantry
 24th Regiment of Madras Native Infantry
 25th Regiment of Madras Native Infantry
 26th Regiment of Madras Native Infantry
 27th Regiment of Madras Native Infantry
 28th Regiment of Madras Native Infantry
 29th Regiment of Madras Native Infantry
 30th Regiment of Madras Native Infantry
 31st Regiment of Madras Native Infantry Trichinopoly Light Infantry
 32nd Regiment of Madras Native Infantry
 33rd Regiment of Madras Native Infantry
 34th Regiment of Madras Native Infantry Chicacole Light Infantry
 35th Regiment of Madras Native Infantry
 36th Regiment of Madras Native Infantry
 37th Regiment of Madras Native Infantry
 38th Regiment of Madras Native Infantry
 39th Regiment of Madras Native Infantry
 40th Regiment of Madras Native Infantry
 41st Regiment of Madras Native Infantry
 42nd Regiment of Madras Native Infantry
 43rd Regiment of Madras Native Infantry
 44th Regiment of Madras Native Infantry
 45th Regiment of Madras Native Infantry
 46th Regiment of Madras Native Infantry
 47th Regiment of Madras Native Infantry
 48th Regiment of Madras Native Infantry
 49th Regiment of Madras Native Infantry
 50th Regiment of Madras Native Infantry
 Madras Rifle Corps

Madras European Infantry 
 1st Madras (European) Fusiliers
 2nd Madras (European) Light Infantry
 3rd Madras (European) Infantry

Madras Light Cavalry 
 1st Madras Light Cavalry
 2nd Madras Light Cavalry
 3rd Madras Light Cavalry
 4th Madras Light Cavalry
 5th Madras Light Cavalry
 6th Madras Light Cavalry
 7th Madras Light Cavalry
 8th Madras Light Cavalry

Artillery 
 Madras Foot Artillery (effectively divided into the 'Natives' and 'Europeans', but not segregated into battalions.) The sub-units of the group included;
1st Battalion (Formed 1765)
A Company (raised as 1st) raised 1748, re-designated as 1st Battery, 17th Brigade Royal Artillery 19 February 1862
B Company (raised as 2nd) raised 1753, re-designated as 2nd Bty, 17th Bde, Royal Artillery 19 Feb 1862
C Company (raised as 3rd) raised 1753, re-designated as 3rd Bty, 17th Bde, Royal Artillery 19 Feb 1862
D Company (raised as 4th) raised 1767, re-designated as 4th Bty, 17th Bde, Royal Artillery 19 Feb 1862
E Company (raised as 10th) raised 1786, re-designated as B Co, 3rd Btn 1825
F Company raised 1800, re-designated as C Co, 2nd Btn 1825
G Company raised 1800, disbanded 1824
2nd Battalion (formed 1786)
A Company (raised as 5th) raised 1786, re-designated as 1st Bty, 20th Bde, RA 19 February 1862
B Company (raised as 6th) raised 1778, re-designated as 2nd Bty, 20th Bde, RA 19 February 1862
C Company (raised as 7th) raised 1778, re-designated as 3rd Bty Bty, 20th Bde, RA 19 February 1862
D Company (raised as 8th) raised 1778, re-designated as 4th Bty, 20th Bde, RA 19 February 1862
E Company (raised as 9th) raised 1786, re-designated as D Co, 2nd Btn 1825
F Company raised 1799, re-designated as A Co, 2nd Btn 1825
G Company raised 1817, disbanded 1824
3rd Battalion (formed 1825)
A Company joined 1825, re-designated as 1st Bty, 23rd Bde, RA 19 February 1862
B Company joined 1825, re-designated as 2nd Bty, 23rd Bde, RA 19 February 1862
C Company joined 1825, re-designated as 3rd Bty, 23rd Bde, RA 19 February 1862
D Company joined 1825, re-designated as 4th Bty, 23rd Bde, RA 19 February 1862
4th Battalion (raised 1845)
A Company raised 1845, re-designated as 5th Bty, 17th Bde, RA 19 February 1862
B Company raised 1845, re-designated as 6th Bty, 17th Bde, RA 19 February 1862
C Company raised 1845, re-designated as 5th Bty, 20th Bde, RA 19 February 1862
D Company raised 1845, re-designated as 5th Bty, 23rd Bde, RA 19 February 1862
 Madras Horse Artillery (all units transferred to Royal Artillery on 13 April 1864)
A Troop (formed 1st Half-sqn then 'The Trp' then 1st Trp) formed in 1806, reformed in 1809 and 1810 then transferred as A Battery, 3rd Horse Artillery Brigade, RA
B Troop (formed as 2nd Troop) formed in 1810 then transferred as B Battery, 3rd Horse Artillery Brigade, RA 
C Troop (formed as the Madras Rocket Troop, then Reserve Troop) formed in 1816, reformed in 1821 then transferred as C Battery, 3rd Horse Artillery Brigade, RA
D Troop formed in 1825 then transferred as D Battery, 3rd Horse Artillery Brigade, RA
E (Native) Troop formed in 1825, amalgamated with F Troop in 1860
F (Native) Troop formed in 1825, amalgamated with E Troop in 1860, disbanded 1866

Engineers 
 Corps of Madras Sappers and Miners

List of Commanders of the Fort St George garrison 
Commanders included:

 Lieutenant Jermin (1640–49)
 Lieutenant Richard Minors (1649–51)
 Captain James Martin (1651–54)
 Lieutenant Richard Minors (1654–55)
 Sergeant Thomas Sutton (1655–58)
 Captain Roger Middleton (1658–60)
 Lieutenant William Hull (1660)
 Captain Thomas Axtell (1661–64)
 Lieutenant Francis Chuseman (1664–68)
 Lieutenant Timothy Sutton (1668–73)
 Captain Philip O' Neale (1673–80)
 Captain James Bett (1680–92)
 Captain Francis Seaton (1692–1707)
 Captain Gabriel Poirier (1707–16)
 Major John Roach (1716–19)
 Captain Alexander Fullerton (1719–23)
 Captain Alexander Sutherland (1723–24)
 Major John Roach (1724–29)
 Major David Wilson (1729–38)
 Captain Peter Eckman (1738–43)
 Major Charles Knipe (1743)
 Captain Peter Eckman (1743–46)

Commanders-in-Chief
Commanders-in-chief included:
Commander-in-Chief, Madras Army

 Major Stringer Lawrence (1st term) (1748–1749)
 Captain Rodolphus de Gingens (1749–1752) 
 Major Stinger Lawrence (2nd term) (1752–1754)
 Lieutenant-Colonel John Adlercron (1754–1757)
 Lieutenant-Colonel Stringer Lawrence (3rd term) (1757–1759)
 Colonel Eyre Coote (1759–1761)
 Major-General Stringer Lawrence (4th term) (1761–1766)
 Brigadier General John Caillaud (1766–1767)
 Brigadier General Joseph Smith (1767–1770)
 Major General Eyre Coote (1770)
 Brigadier General Joseph Smith (1770–1772)
 Colonel Sir Robert Fletcher (1772–1773)
 Brigadier General Joseph Smith (1773–1775)
 Brigadier General Sir Robert Fletcher (1775–1776)
 Brigadier General James Stuart (1776–1777, serving the Majority in Council during the coup ousting Governor George Pigot)
 Colonel Ross Lang (1777–1778)
 Major General Sir Hector Munro (1778–1782)
 Major General James Stuart (1782–1783)
 Colonel Sir John Burgoyne (17 Sept 1783)
 Lieutenant General Ross Lang (1783–1785)
 Lieutenant General Sir John Dalling (1785–1786)
 Major General Sir Archibald Campbell (1786–1789, while Governor of Madras)
 Brigadier General Mathew Horne and Colonel John Floyd (1789–1790)
 Major General William Medows (1790–1792, while Governor of Madras)
 Colonel John Braithwaite (1792–1796)
 Major-General Alured Clarke (1796–1797)
 Major-General George Harris (1797–1800)
 Major-General John Braithwaite (1800–1801)
 Major-General James Stuart (1801–1804)
 Major-General John Cradock (1804–1807)
 Lieutenant-General Hay McDowall (1807–1810)
 Major-General Sir Samuel Auchmuty (1810–1813)
 Lieutenant-General Sir John Abercromby (1813)
 Lieutenant-General Sir Thomas Hislop (1814–1820)
 Lieutenant-General Sir Alexander Campbell (1820–1825)
 Lieutenant-General Sir George Walker (1825–1831)
 Lieutenant-General Sir Robert O'Callaghan (1831–1836)
 Lieutenant-General Sir Peregrine Maitland (1836–1838)
 Lieutenant-General Sir Jasper Nicolls (1838–1839)
 Lieutenant-General Sir Samuel Whittingham (1839–1841)
 Lieutenant-General The Marquess of Tweeddale (1842–1848)
 Lieutenant-General Sir George Berkeley (1848–1851)
 Lieutenant-General Sir Richard Armstrong (1851–1853)
 Lieutenant-General William Staveley (1853–1854)
 Lieutenant-General George Anson (1854–1856)
 Lieutenant-General Sir Patrick Grant (1856–1861)
 Lieutenant-General Sir James Grant (1861–1864)
 Lieutenant-General Sir John Le Marchant (1865–1867)
 Lieutenant-General William McCleverty (1867–1871)
 Lieutenant-General Sir Frederick Haines (1871–1876)
 Lieutenant-General Sir Neville Chamberlain (1876–1880)
 Lieutenant-General Sir Frederick Roberts (1880–1885)
 Lieutenant-General Sir Herbert Macpherson (1886)
 Lieutenant-General Sir Charles Arbuthnot (1886–1891)
 Lieutenant-General Sir James Dormer (1891–1893)
 Lieutenant-General Sir Charles Clarke (1893–1895)

Commander-in-Chief, Madras Command
 Lieutenant-General Sir Charles Clarke (1895–1898)
 Lieutenant-General Sir George Wolseley (1898–1903)
 (acting) Major-General Sir George Pretyman (1902) during Wolseley's extended leave following his wife's death
 Lieutenant-General Sir Charles Egerton (1903–1907)

See also
 Presidency armies
 Bengal Army 
 Bombay Army

References

Sources

 

British East India Company
Military of British India
Military history of the Madras Presidency
Military history of the British East India Company
1757 establishments in British India